Montserrado-11 is an electoral district for the elections to the House of Representatives of Liberia. The district covers the eastern parts of Caldwell township (Caldwell Market, Upper Caldwell, Dixville Water Side, Samukai Town and Cassava Hill), all of Dixville township, parts of Barnersville township (all communities except Johnsonville Road A) and four communities of the Gardnersville township (Grass Field, Barnersville Road, Day Break Mouth Open and J.E. Marshall).

Elected representatives

References

Electoral districts in Liberia